Glutathione S-transferase omega-1 is an enzyme that in humans is encoded by the GSTO1 gene.

This gene encodes a member of the theta class glutathione S-transferase-like (GSTTL) protein family. In mouse, the encoded protein acts as a small stress response protein, likely involved in cellular redox homeostasis. This protein has dehydroascorbate reductase activity and may function in the glutathione-ascorbate cycle as part of antioxidant metabolism.

References

Further reading